Fugue State Press (established 1992) is a small New York City fiction publisher, specializing in the experimental novel. Novelist James Chapman is the founder and publisher.
    
It has published 28 titles to date, including work by Chapman, Joshua Cohen, Stephen Dixon, Noah Cicero, Shane Jones, Ben Brooks, Prakash Kona, Eckhard Gerdes, André Malraux, W. B. Keckler, Vi Khi Nao, J. A. Tyler, and I Rivers. Both American and international authors are represented. The books are distributed in the United States by Small Press Distribution (SPD).

Books 

Publications have included:

 Story of A Story and Other Stories: A Novel by Stephen Dixon
 Cadenza for the Schneidermann Violin Concerto by Joshua Cohen
 The Kingdom of Farfelu/Paper Moons by André Malraux
 The Human War by Noah Cicero
 Stet by James Chapman
 The Failure Six by Shane Jones
 Fences by Ben Brooks
 Streets that Smell of Dying Roses by Prakash Kona

References

External links
 Fugue State Press website
 Interview with the publisher

Book publishing companies based in New York (state)
Small press publishing companies
Postmodern literature
Publishing companies established in 1992